Concepción is a town in central Peru, capital of the province Concepción in the region Junín. During the War of the Pacific in July 1882, Concepción was the location of the Battle of La Concepción, in which a force of 77 Chilean soldiers was annihilated by 1,300 Peruvians.

References

External links
 Municipal website 

Populated places in the Junín Region